Lee Si-woo (Hangul: 이시우; born ) is a South Korean male volleyball player. He is part of the South Korea men's national volleyball team. On club level he currently plays for the Cheonan Hyundai Capital Skywalkers.

Career

Clubs
In the 2016 V-League Draft, Lee was selected sixth overall by the Hyundai Capital Skywalkers.

In the 2016–17 season, Lee won his first championship, helping the Skywalkers clinch their third V-League title. Playing as primarily a serving specialist, he served 12 aces while adding 13 kills and 10 digs.

National team
In May 2017 Lee was first selected for the South Korean senior national team to compete at the 2017 FIVB World League. He appeared in all nine games and tallied three aces as a serving specialist.

After finishing the World League in 18th place, he also took part in the 2017 Asian Championship, where South Korea won the bronze medal.

External links
 Lee Si-woo at the International Volleyball Federation (FIVB)

1994 births
Living people
South Korean men's volleyball players
People from Siheung
Sportspeople from Gyeonggi Province
21st-century South Korean people